Valalai is a small town in Sri Lanka. It is located within Northern Province.

See also
List of towns in Northern Province, Sri Lanka

External links

Towns in Jaffna District
Valikamam East DS Division